Byung-wook is a Korean masculine given name. Its meaning depends on the hanja used to write each syllable of the name. There are 17 hanja with the reading "byung" and 11 hanja with the reading "wook" on the South Korean government's official list of hanja which may be registered for use in given names.

People with this name include:
Ri Byong-uk (born 1954), North Korean boxer
Ko Byung-wook (born 1992), South Korean football forward
Lee Byungwook, South Korean scientist, author of the biological sequence patent database Patome

See also
List of Korean given names

References

Korean masculine given names